I Am Come is an album by Part Chimp. It was released in 2005 on the Rock Action Records label, most commonly associated with the post-rock band, Mogwai.

Track listing 
 "Båkahatsü" - 1:33
 "Wår Machine" - 3:21
 "Hèllo Bastards" - 3:37
 "Bubbles" - 2:38
 "Pvnishment Ridè" - 4:45
 "Bring Back the Sound" - 3:30
 "Dr. Horse Part Two" - 3:29
 "Fastø" (Often incorrectly listed as "Fatso") - 3:03
 "I Am Come" - 4:20
 "30,000,000,000,000,000 People" - 6:05
 "Ashita No Båkahatsü" - 3:45

References

External links 
 Rock Action Records site
 Part Chimp official site
 Part Chimp official Myspace

2005 albums
Part Chimp albums